John Giffard may refer to:
John Giffard, 1st Baron Giffard (1232–1299), English nobleman
John Giffard (died 1556) (c. 1465–1556), Tudor courtier, soldier, MP and landowner, of Chillington Hall, Staffordshire
John Giffard (died 1613) (1534–1613), landowner, MP and noted Elizabethan recusant, of Chillington Hall
John Giffard (1602–1665), colonel, Civil War commander, of Brightley, Devon
John Giffard, 3rd Earl of Halsbury (1908–2000), British peer and scientist
John Giffard (MP for Gloucestershire), 14th century, see Gloucestershire
John Giffard (MP for Buckinghamshire) (died c. 1436), MP for Buckinghamshire, see Knights of Buckinghamshire
John Giffard (judge), 14th-century English-born lawyer and cleric in Ireland
 John Giffard (police officer) (born 1951/2), British police officer, former chief constable of Staffordshire Police

See also
John Gifford (disambiguation)
Giffard (disambiguation)